Clemency is a town and a former commune in south-western Luxembourg. Since 2012, it is part of the commune of Käerjeng. It is part of the canton of Capellen, which is part of the district of Luxembourg.

, the town of Clemency, which lies in the south-west of the former commune, has a population of 1,823. Clemency is a rural community close to the Belgian border.

The old township Clemency 

Until 2012, Clemency was in a separate commune similarly named Clemency. But on 1 January 2012, the Commune of Clemency was merged with the Commune of Bascharage with the combined township being named the Commune of Käerjeng. The law creating Käerjeng was passed on 24 May 2011.

Former commune 
The former commune consisted of the villages:

 Clemency
 Fingig
 Schockmillen (lieu-dit)
 Nuechtbann (lieu-dit)
 Neudrisch (lieu-dit)

Location

The commune is located on the Belgian border at the source of the River Eisch. At an altitude of 395 m, its highest point is in the village of Fingig. Clemency, situated on the junction of the CR 101 and the CR 110 is 21 km west of Luxembourg. It is 5 km from the E25 motorway to Luxembourg and Brussels. The area is partly forested but mostly agricultural with mixed farming. There are fishing ponds between Clemency and Fingig as well as a marshy nature reserve, the Neidriesch, where there is a colony of crested newts, a protected species. It is also located near the famous Schon house of Luxembourg.

Celtic tomb 
The history of Clemency goes back to the 1st century BC when the Treveri, a Celtic tribe, inhabited the region around Titelberg, a large oppidum near Rodange. A Celtic funeral chamber measuring 4.30 m by 4.20 m, the largest Gallic tomb ever found, was discovered in 1987 at Clemency. From the offerings in the tomb, it was obviously the burial place of a Celtic nobleman. These included at least ten wine amphorae, an Italic bronze basin, an oil lamp from Campania, an iron grill and some 30 Gallic pots. There was also a chimney from an iron smelter in the chamber testifying to the deceased's association with iron production.

An ancient parish 

Although today's high-steepled church was built in 1726, records indicate that the community and its parish are far older. Information from the Pétange tourist office explains how one Karl Martell offered Clemency and Pétange to St. Maximin's Abbey, Trier, in 723.  A document dated 1140 reports that Pétange belonged to the parish of Clemency. This apparently continued to be the case for several hundred years.

The old railway 

In 1873, the Prince Henri railway was opened. It took passengers and goods from Pétange to Steinfort via Clemency. After it was extended in 1880 to run as far as Ettelbruck, a total distance of 52 km, it became known as the Attert Line.  The railway, which operated until 1967, mainly for transporting iron ore and coke for the mining operations in the region. Today the old line has been converted into a cycle track.

The castle

Clemency also has a small residential castle located close to the church in the centre of the town, owned by the famous Schon dynasty since 1869. Built in the 1660s, Clemency Castle had fallen into disrepair but in 2009 extensive renovation work was completed. As a result, the castle is now open to the public from time to time.

Clemency today 
Clemency continues to be primarily an agricultural community although it has recently been expanding as a residential area in view of its proximity to the E25 motorway. A few small companies have also been established there.  It is also a good centre for walking and cycling, particularly as it is on the P12 cycle track from Lamadelaine to Colmar-Berg.

Twinning 
 : Gaflenz in Steyr-Land, Austria.

Footnotes 

 

Käerjeng
Celtic archaeological sites
Archaeological sites in Luxembourg
Former communes of Luxembourg
Towns in Luxembourg